The following lists events that happened during 1972 in Cape Verde.

Incumbents
Colonial governor: António Adriano Faria Lopes dos Santos

Events

Sports
CD Travadores won the Cape Verdean Football Championship

References

 
1972 in the Portuguese Empire
Years of the 20th century in Cape Verde
1970s in Cape Verde
Cape Verde
Cape Verde